Vladimir Viktorovich Korotkov (born 23 April 1948) is a retired Soviet tennis player who won three Junior Grand Slam tournaments, Wimbledon Juniors in 1964, 1965 and French Juniors in 1965. He also won (with Zaiga Jansone) the mixed doubles at the 1968 Summer Olympics where tennis was a "demonstration sport". He won the men's doubles event at the 1973 Summer Universiade and the 1977 USSR singles championship. Since 1981 and until his retirement in 1996, Korotkov was coaching at several sports clubs.

Playing career 
Vladimir Korotkov started playing tennis at the age of five. His first coach was Tamara Dubrovina at the sports club CSKA Moscow. Later Korotkov graduated from the Central State Institute for Physical Culture.

In 1963, Korotkov won the Soviet youth championships in mixed doubles with Marina Chuvyrina, and the next year he won the senior Soviet championships in men's doubles with Vyacheslav Egorov. The same year, he reached the finals of the juniors of Wimbledon Championships, losing to Ismail El Shafei. In 1965, though, he returned to the finals of the Wimbledon juniors, and this time won. In 1966, he became a two-time Wimbledon juniors champion and added to it the title of French juniors champion. In 1966 he also won his second Soviet championships in men's doubles (once again with Egorov).

In 1968, Korotkov was included in the Soviet team at the 1968 Summer Olympics in Mexico. There were only demonstration and exhibition tennis events played at the Olympics, and Korotkov who won a gold at the mixed doubles exhibition event and two bronze medals at men's singles and doubles is not considered an Olympic champion.

During the rest of his playing career, Korotkov repeatedly reached the finals of the Soviet championships in men's doubles (last time in 1979) and in mixed doubles (1970). His highest achievement at this level was winning the 1977 Soviet championships in singles where he defeated Vadim Borisov in the final. He also won several All-Union tennis tournaments of lesser rank. From 1966 to 1977, he was a part of the Soviet Top 10 list of players, reaching no. 3 in 1973.

Korotkov successfully played in international amateur tournaments, winning a number of international tournaments played in the Soviet Union, including doubles event at the 1973 Summer Universiade. He was a part of the Soviet Union Davis Cup team between 1969 and 1974, winning 10 out of 21 rubbers. In 1974, he won the European Zone with the Soviet team but lost to the India Davis Cup team in the inter-zonal semifinals. After the start of the Open Era, Korotkov played in some open tournaments with limited success; his best results were the fourth round of the Italian Open in 1969 (defeating Charlie Pasarell and Owen Davidson on his way) and in 1973 (defeating Cliff Richey). He also reached the third round at the first Open Wimbledon Championships in 1968.

Coaching career 
After finishing active playing career, Korotkov became a coach. He worked at several sports clubs between 1981 and 1996, including Moscow Tennis Academy in 1993–1994.

Korotkov was nominated repeatedly for the spot at the Russian Tennis Hall of Fame, but every time lost, first to Sergei Likhachev, then to Teimuraz Kakulia and finally to Andrej Potanin. He was finally inducted in 2014.

References

External sources 
 
 
 
 Korotkov Vladimir Viktorovich at the Russian Tennis Encyclopedia 

1948 births
Living people
French Championships junior (tennis) champions
Olympic tennis players of the Soviet Union
Soviet male tennis players
Tennis players at the 1968 Summer Olympics
Wimbledon junior champions
Universiade medalists in tennis
Universiade gold medalists for the Soviet Union
Grand Slam (tennis) champions in boys' singles
Medalists at the 1973 Summer Universiade